Arnulf III (died 22 February 1071) was Count of Flanders from 1070 until his death at the Battle of Cassel in 1071.

Born , Arnulf was the eldest son of Baldwin VI, Count of Flanders, and Richilde, Countess of Mons and Hainaut. On his deathbed in 1070, Baldwin left Flanders to his elder son, Arnulf, and Hainaut to the younger son, Baldwin, with the provision that if either preceded the other in death, he would inherit the other's county as well. Baldwin VI further entrusted his brother Robert with the safeguard of his son Arnulf, who was still a minor, to which Robert gave his oath of homage and solemn promise to protect his nephew. Richilde was to be regent in Flanders until Arnulf came of age.

After his father's death in 1070, his uncle Robert broke his oath and disputed the succession. Richilde appealed to King Philip I of France, who summoned Robert to appear before him. Robert refused and continued his aggression against Richilde and Arnulf, at which point Philip amassed an army which he brought to Flanders. The French army was accompanied by Norman troops, probably sent by Arnulf's aunt Queen Matilda and led by William FitzOsborn. Also allied to Arnulf III was Eustace II, Count of Boulogne who raised considerable support for the young count and his mother. The two forces met at the Battle of Cassel on 22 February 1071. In that engagement Robert's forces were ultimately victorious but Robert himself was captured and his forces in turn captured the Countess Richilde. Both were freed in exchange and the battle continued to its conclusion. Among the dead was Arnulf, killed by Gerbod the Fleming, 1st Earl of Chester, possibly by accident. As a result of the battle Robert claimed the countship of Flanders. The Countess Richilde and her son Baldwin returned to Hainaut but continued to instigate hostilities against Robert. As he was a minor at his death and unmarried, Arnulf III had no issue.

See also
Counts of Flanders family tree

Notes

References

House of Flanders
Arnulf 3
Arnulf 1
Flanders, Arnulf III, Count of
Flanders, Arnulf III, Count of
Flanders, Arnulf III, Count of